Sameradion is the Sámi languages radio department of Swedish public service broadcaster Sveriges Radio (SR). Sameradion provides news, current affairs, cultural, sports, entertainment, and children’s programming for Sámi across Sweden.

Broadcast operations
Sameradion broadcasts weekdays and Sundays on FM and DAB via Sveriges Radio P2, along with short twice-weekly broadcasts on P4 Jämtland and around the clock online via SR Sápmi. SR Sápmi also carries Sámi music, youth radio, sports, and public events. The channel broadcasts primarily in Northern Sámi, but also broadcasts regularly in Lule and Southern Sámi.

Ole Isak Mienna oversees Sameradion.

As part of SR, Sameradion and its sister television channel SVT Sápmi work with reporters and bureaus across Sweden, but it also shares reporting and programming with NRK Sápmi and Yle Sami Radio, the Sámi-focused public services in Norway and Finland respectively. The station is based in Giron, Sweden, with bureaus in Arvidsjaur, Luleju, Umeå, and Stockholm, Sweden, as well as Guovdageaidnu and Kárášjohka, Norway.

History
Sameradion traces its roots to the 1950s, when SR began broadcasting programming targeting Sámi listeners, albeit in Swedish. In 1965, Sameradion began broadcasting regularly in Sámi languages.

References

Sveriges Radio
Radio stations in Sweden
Sámi in Sweden